In mathematics, specifically in functional analysis and Hilbert space theory, vector-valued Hahn–Banach theorems are generalizations of the Hahn–Banach theorems from linear functionals (which are always valued in the real numbers  or the complex numbers )  to linear operators valued in topological vector spaces (TVSs).

Definitions

Extensions

1-extensions

Injective spaces

A locally convex topological vector space  is injective if for every locally convex space  containing  as a topological vector subspace, there exists a continuous projection from  onto .

Properties

Existence

Consequently, it suffices to only consider maps from closed vector subspaces into complete Hausdorff spaces.

Results

Any locally convex space having the extension property is injective.

In 1953, Alexander Grothendieck showed that any Banach space with the extension property is either finite-dimensional or else  separable.

{{Math theorem|name=Theorem |math_statement=
Suppose that  is a Banach space over the field 
Then the following are equivalent:
  is 1-injective;
  has the metric extension property;
  has the immediate 1-extension property;
  has the center-radius property;
  has the weak intersection property;
  is 1-complemented in any Banach space into which it is norm embedded;
(This space  is unique up to homeomorphism).

where if in addition,  is a vector space over the real numbers then we may add to this list:
  has the binary intersection property;
  is linearly isometric to a complete Archimedean ordered vector lattice with order unit and endowed with the order unit norm.
}}

Examples

Products of the underlying field

Give  its usual product topology, which makes it into a Hausdorff locally convex TVS.
Then  has the extension property. 

For any set  the Lp space  has both the extension property and the metric extension property.

See also

Citations

References

  
  
  
  

Topological vector spaces
Theorems in functional analysis